Lovelock is a surname. Notable people with the surname include:

Adam Lovelock (born 1982), Australian boxer
Bill Lovelock (1922–2003), English songwriter and television producer
Christopher Lovelock (1940–2008), British academic
David Lovelock (born 1938), British theoretical physicist and mathematician
Damien Lovelock (1954–2019), Australian musician
Douglas Lovelock (1923–2014), English civil servant
Irene Lovelock (1896–1974), British activist
Jack Lovelock (1910–1949), New Zealand athlete
James Lovelock (1919–2022), British scientist, environmentalist and futurologist
Millie Lovelock, New Zealand musician
Mitchell Lovelock-Fay (born 1992), Australian cyclist 
Ossie Lovelock (1911–1981), Australian sportsman
Ray Lovelock (actor) (1950–2017), Italian actor
William Lovelock (1899–1986), British classical composer and pedagogue
Yann Lovelock (born 1939), British writer

Fictional characters:
 Ray Lovelock (Macross), a character in Macross